Scott is a town in Brown County in the U.S. state of Wisconsin. As of the 2020 census, the population was 3,636. The unincorporated communities of Bay Settlement, Benderville, Chapel Ridge, Edgewater Beach, New Franken, Red Banks, and Wequiock are located in the town.

Geography

Scott is located in northeastern Brown County along the southeast shore of Green Bay, an arm of Lake Michigan. The city of Green Bay borders the town to the west and south. The town of Green Bay, a separate municipality, borders Scott to the east, and the town of Humboldt is to the south.

The Hazen archeological site consists of remains left from a 19th-century farmstead located in the town.

Demographics

As of the census of 2000, there were 3,712 people, 1,145 households, and 906 families residing in the town. The population density was 188.5 people per square mile (72.8/km2).  There were 1,234 housing units at an average density of 62.7 per square mile (24.2/km2). The racial makeup of the town was 96.12% White, 1.62% African American, 0.35% Native American, 0.65% Asian, 0.57% from other races, and 0.70% from two or more races. Hispanic or Latino of any race were 1.48% of the population.

There were 1,145 households, out of which 37.9% had children under the age of 18 living with them, 71.9% were married couples living together, 4.0% had a female householder with no husband present, and 20.8% were non-families. 14.7% of all households were made up of individuals, and 4.3% had someone living alone who was 65 years of age or older. The average household size was 2.73 and the average family size was 3.04.

In the town, the population was spread out, with 23.0% under the age of 18, 16.8% from 18 to 24, 30.7% from 25 to 44, 22.1% from 45 to 64, and 7.5% who were 65 years of age or older. The median age was 33 years. For every 100 females, there were 95.6 males. For every 100 females age 18 and over, there were 98.3 males.

The median income for a household in the town was $58,051, and the median income for a family was $62,138. Males had a median income of $41,996 versus $26,167 for females. The per capita income for the town was $21,992. About 0.6% of families and 2.0% of the population were below the poverty line, including 0.6% of those under age 18 and 0.6% of those age 65 or over.

References

External links
Town of Scott official website

Towns in Brown County, Wisconsin
Green Bay metropolitan area
Towns in Wisconsin